This is a list of comic book and superhero podcasts. The list contains podcasts that have been explicitly described as comic book podcasts or superhero podcasts by reliable secondary sources that demonstrate each podcast's notability. The type of release can be either episodic or serial, while the delivery of each podcast can vary significantly from a fully scripted audio drama to an unscripted conversation. Other styles can include interview, improvised skit, or narrated short stories. The contents of each podcast can vary from stories of fiction to nonfiction discussions revolving around fiction in media.

List

See also 

 List of comic books
List of superheroes

References

External links 
  on Player FM
  on Player FM
  on Podchaser

Comic book
Comic book podcasts
Podcasts